Cille Gad (1675-1711)  was a Norwegian poet and culture personality. She was also well known as a female academic, something regarded as notable during by her contemporaries.

Biography 
Cille Gad was born and grew up in Bergen, Norway.  She was the daughter of  Knud Gad (d. 1711) and Anna Abrahamsdatter. Her father was a printer and auditor. Her mother was the cousin of Dorothe Engelbretsdatter. She  received instruction in Greek, Latin, and Hebrew from her father.

She early wrote poems in Latin, but they were presumably destroyed by the great fire of Bergen in 1702. In 1705, she secretly gave birth to a fetus which was found dead. She was arrested, but her correspondent Otto Sperling appealed to the monarch that a learned female should not be executed. She was released in 1707 and banished from Bergen.  In 1708 she was at the University of Copenhagen. From 1708, she lived in Copenhagen and socialized in the learned circles around the university and known as a poet. She died unmarried in 1711, probably of the plague.

Legacy
She is believed to have been the inspiration for till Zille Hans Dotters Gynaicologia eller Forsvars Skrift for Qvinde-Kiønnet by Ludvig Holberg (1722). She was included in a dictionary of learned women by Otto Sperling, to whom she also dedicated poems.

References 

18th-century Norwegian poets
1675 births
1711 deaths
17th-century Norwegian poets
18th-century Norwegian women writers
17th-century Norwegian women writers
Norwegian women poets